Disciadidae is a family of crustaceans belonging to the order Decapoda.

Genera:
 Discias Rathbun, 1902
 Kirnasia Burukovsky, 1988
 Lucaya Chace, 1939
 Tridiscias Kensley, 1983

References

Decapods